Palcazu District is one of eight districts of the province Oxapampa in Peru.

References